Kord Kandi (also Romanized as Kord Kandī and Kurd-Kandi) is a village in Qareh Poshtelu-e Bala Rural District, Qareh Poshtelu District, Zanjan County, Zanjan Province, Iran. At the 2006 census, its population was 322, in 76 families.

References 

Populated places in Zanjan County